Nigel Dutton (born 27 July 1951) is a South African cricketer. He played in one List A match for Eastern Province in 1973/74.

See also
 List of Eastern Province representative cricketers

References

External links
 

1951 births
Living people
South African cricketers
Eastern Province cricketers
Place of birth missing (living people)